John G. Bryden (August 25, 1937 – July 24, 2016) is a former Canadian Senator.

A lawyer, former public servant and businessman, Bryden was summoned to the Senate as a Liberal by Governor General Ray Hnatyshyn, on the advice of Prime Minister Jean Chrétien, on November 23, 1994. He represented the province of New Brunswick until his resignation on October 31, 2009.

References

External links 
 
Liberal Senate Forum

1937 births
2016 deaths
Liberal Party of Canada senators
Canadian senators from New Brunswick
21st-century Canadian politicians